The 1968 Montana State Bobcats football team was an American football team that represented Montana State University in the Big Sky Conference during the 1968 NCAA College Division football season. In their first season under head coach Tom Parac, the Bobcats compiled a 6–4 record (3–1 against Big Sky opponents) and tied for the conference championship.

Schedule

References

Montana State
Montana State Bobcats football seasons
Big Sky Conference football champion seasons
Montana State Bobcats football